Olav Johan Sundal (8 August 1899 – 21 January 1978) was a Norwegian gymnast who competed in the 1920 Summer Olympics. He was part of the Norwegian team, which won the gold medal in the gymnastics men's team, free system event. His interment was at Vestre gravlund.

References

1899 births
1978 deaths
Norwegian male artistic gymnasts
Gymnasts at the 1920 Summer Olympics
Olympic gymnasts of Norway
Olympic silver medalists for Norway
Olympic medalists in gymnastics
Medalists at the 1920 Summer Olympics
20th-century Norwegian people